Quintus Aelius Tubero may refer to:
 Quintus Aelius Tubero (consul), Roman consul in 11 BC
 Quintus Aelius Tubero (historian), Roman jurist and historian
 Quintus Aelius Tubero (Stoic)